Prodigal was a Contemporary Christian music group from Cincinnati, Ohio that released three albums in the 1980s. The group's sound ranged from radio-friendly pop to keyboard-driven new wave to pop country. The group members were keyboardist Loyd Boldman, drummer Dave Workman, guitarist Rick Fields and bassist Mike Wilson. Boldman, Workman and Fields would trade off lead vocalist duties depending on the track.  Boldman generally handled the rock-oriented tracks, while Workman and Fields split the more pop- and new wave-focused material. Boldman died in 2014.

Career
Prodigal's self-titled debut album was released in 1982. It was named Album of the Year in 1982 by Group magazine (along with Amy Grant's Age to Age and Petra's More Power to Ya).

Electric Eye, the group's second album, was published in 1984. It received Best of the Year honors in 1984 from both CCM Magazine and Campus Life. A computer program for the Commodore 64 was mastered into a "stop-groove" or "locked groove" at the end of the vinyl record. The short BASIC program shows a static screen containing a lightly paraphrased quotation from Albert Einstein and a Biblical verse (John 14:27). The video for "Boxes" (written by Workman and directed by Boldman), won the first Gospel Music Association (GMA) Dove Award for music videos ("Best Visual Song"). The music video for the song "Fast Forward" was named Video of the Year by the National Federation of Local Cable Programmers (now the Alliance for Community Media).

Just Like Real Life was the group's third and final album, appearing in 1985. The Christian Music Archive said "This is an excellent album by one of the early new wave/rock hybrid bands of the early to mid-eighties, using equal parts keyboards and rock guitar. Sadly the band didn't get the recognition they so richly deserved, as this was a cut above most Christian albums of the time with instantly memorable songs and lyrics so intelligently written as to be in a class of their own. If they had been a secular band, they would have been early MTV stars. An essential album."

Prodigal had success on Christian radio with the songs "Invisible Man" (from Prodigal), the No. 1 single "Scene of the Crime" and "Emerald City" (from Electric Eye) and "Jump Cut" from Just Like Real Life. The band also created a number of promotional music videos for Electric Eye and Just Like Real Life.

The Encyclopedia of Contemporary Christian Music says, "Prodigal was in tune with the sounds and spirit of the early ‘80's...while writing songs that expanded the boundaries of the worship and evangelism fare that typified contemporary Christian music at the time."

Prodigal discography 
1982 Prodigal
1984 Electric Eye
1985 Just Like Real Life
2014 Electric Eye 30th Anniversary 3-CD Boxed Set
2018 Prodigal Retroactive Records Legends Remastered Series CD Reissue
2018 Electric Eye Retroactive Records Legends Remastered Series CD Reissue
2018 Just Like Real LifeRetroactive Records Legends Remastered Series CD Reissue
2020 Electric Eye Vinyl Remaster

Loyd Boldman discography 
1988 Sleep Without Dreams
1997 One Hallelujah: A Northland Worship Album
2000 How Can I Keep From Singing: A Northland Worship Album
2007 Where God Wants To Be: Northland Christmas Worship

Rick Fields discography 
1988 Sleep Without Dreams - Loyd Boldman
1998 My One Desire - Vineyard Community Church
1999 Finishing School - The Perkolaters
2000 Deeper State of Blue - Janet Pressley
2001 Open Hands Bare Feet - Crossroads Band
2001 World of the Satisfyn' Place - David Wolfenberger
2002 (It's Always) Sunrise For Someone - Sunrise for Someone
2004 Songs for the Journey - Crossroads Band
2006 Portrait of Narcissus - David Wolfenberger
2008 Summer Lake Champion - Sunrise for Someone
2009 On Top of the World - The Perkolaters
2010 Blue Water - Mick Denton

Dave Workman discography 
1981 Behold the Man - Zion\Rich Mullins
1998 My One Desire - Vineyard Community Church

References 

Christian rock groups from Ohio
Musical groups established in 1975
Musical groups from Cincinnati